Yelden or Yielden is a village and former civil parish, now in the parish of Melchbourne and Yielden, in the Bedford district, in the ceremonial county of Bedfordshire, England, near the borders with Northamptonshire and Cambridgeshire.
The centre piece of the village is the Castle Mound or Yielden Castle the site of a Norman motte-and-bailey castle. This is now a complex of grassed over earthworks dominated by a central mound.
Other notable features include the church of St Mary, a Wesleyan Chapel built in 1884, the Chequers Public House (Closed since December 2016) and the Yelden Village Hall.
It has a present population of roughly between 150 and 200 adults and between 50 and 100 children living in about 90 residences.

Yelden has its own book under the title Yelden Past and Present produced by the Yelden Parish Study Group that was first printed in 1972. It has since been updated and reprinted in 2001 and is the definitive source of historical information about the village. Much of the information in this article has been made with reference to this publication.

Neighbouring villages include Melchbourne, Newton Bromswold, Upper Dean and Shelton.

History

Archaeological excavations carried out by Bedfordshire County Council along with other historical works have shown evidence of a near continuous occupation in the village dating back to the late Neolithic and early Bronze Age (c.2000 -800 BC). Latterly the village appeared in the Domesday Book of 1086 as 'Giveldene' where an account of its history was recorded. In 1931 the parish had a population of 150. On 1 April 1934 the parish was abolished and merged with Melchbourne to form "Melchbourne and Yelden".

Motte and Bailey Castle

This is a significant archaeological site and one of the most interesting of its type in the county. It was the site of a Norman motte and bailey castle that from Domesday to the 13th century was the stronghold of the Trailly family. It is an imposing feature with a central conical mound rising to about 40 feet above the bottom of its north moat. It is in 2 levels with 2 extensive baileys and is not surrounded by a moat. There have been suggestions that prior to Norman times it was occupied by the Iceni, an ancient tribe of Britains and that they battled with the Romans at the site but opinions differ as to the accuracy of this assertion.
By 1360 it had fallen in disuse and ruin.

Church of St Mary

It is a good example of a village church mainly in the Decorated style. Originally the Trailly family received it from the monks at Thorney Abbey early in the 12th Century and was confirmed to them by a charter of Pope Alexander III in 1162. Although Norman in origin its shows no indication of this in its construction. It consists of a Nave and Chancel dating back to the early 13th Century and had been considerably re-modelled since then, the most notable feature being the tower and broach spire.

War (1939 – 1945)

World War II was a significant time in the history of the village because of its close proximity to Chelveston Aerodrome, which was originally built with three runways in 1941. An Airborne Forces Experimental Establishment detachment began flying from the aerodrome in 1942 with Horsa gliders towed by Short Stirling aircraft. Later in 1942, following the entry of the United States into the war, it eventually became the home of the United States Army Air Forces 305th Bombardment Group, which had four squadrons of Boeing B-17 Flying Fortresses pioneering the daylight formation and bombing procedures of the time. There were almost 2,000 personnel based at the aerodrome flying a total of 337 missions between November 1942 and April 1945. During these missions, a total of 22,362 tons of bombs were dropped on enemy targets and 332 enemy aircraft were claimed shot down at the expense of 154 Allied aircraft and 810 men.

During the aerodromes construction, a series of buildings were erected in the village near the church as quarters for the Women's Auxiliary Air Force (WAAF) but instead became the sergeant's mess for the Americans. In more recent times these buildings, known locally as "the camps," fell into rack and ruin and so were demolished to make way for a new housing development. Today Philips Medows, Stanbrook Way and Forge Gardens stand on these sites.

On 24 March 1944<ref>Pages 136 – 138. Donald, William. ''John Burn One Zero Five: The Story of Chelveston Airfield and the 305th Bomb Group in Pictures. 2005.</ref> a Boeing B-17G Flying Fortress bomber belonging to the US Army Air Forces 422nd Bomb Squadron, 305th Bomb Group (Heavy), crashed on takeoff from RAF Chelveston, killing the entire crew of 10 and 11 persons on the ground. Today Forge Gardens stands on the crash site.
In May 2009 a service was held in the village church and a tablet recording the names of those who died in the crash was dedicated. Two children, Keith (aged 14) and Monica (aged 4), were killed during the crash when the aircraft hit the house they were sleeping in. The remainder of those who died consisted of servicemen who were sleeping in a barrack block which the aircraft hit and the crew of the bomber. It is said that at certain times of the year the distant drone of a B-17 can be heard in the early dawn hours, and there are also various sightings of ghostly airmen seen around the church yard and near to the crash site.

Notable figures
In June 1943, as Yielden had a depleted population, an American Air-force Pilot named Dick Rodgers assisted in the administration and running of the town's noted Strawberry Fayre. During his short stay there, Rodgers became a very popular figure within the community. He encouraged his fellow air-force pilots to volunteer and raise funds for the local church during their time at the Yielden airbase. He later died, whilst completing a supply drop during the Battle of the Bulge. Although his body was never recovered, there is a commemorative plaque on a bench outside the Western gate of the Church.

Joe Ekins (15 July 1923 – 1 February 2012), Tank Gunner, credited by some for killing German tank Commander Michael Wittmann was born in Yielden.

Name spelling

In common with most other place, the village name has evolved over the centuries. The earliest recorded version was 'Giveldene' in 1086 and since then there have been over 20 changes. At one stage (circa 1390) it was recorded as being 'Yelden' before becoming known as Yeveldene in 1461. Other names include Chivelden, Gyueldene, Yueldene, Yealdon, Evelden, Yeveldene, Yielding and Yeilden. Finally it was recorded as being 'Yelden' again in 1830 with the latest variant 'Yielden' having arrived in more recent times.'' 

Depending on which direction you approach from you will find that the name of the village is spelt differently on various sign posts:

Yelden
Yielden
Yeldon

There has been much argument over the correct spelling the village name over recent years and it still remains a matter of confusion for those trying to find their way to the village. A questionnaire on the subject was circulated to villagers in 1998. 44 considered the village to be called 'Yelden' – 30 considered it to be called 'Yielden'. Different organisations take different positions on the spelling: the Royal Mail uses the spelling "Yielden" in official postal addresses, whilst the parish council calls itself "Melchbourne and Yelden" parish council. The Office for National Statistics records the official name of the parish to be "Melchbourne and Yielden", whilst the Ordnance Survey labels the village itself "Yelden", but records the parish name as "Melchbourne and Yielden".

Modern day

Social scene 

Yelden is famed for its Strawberry Fayre which is held on the last Sunday in June each year. This generally attracts thousands of visitors to the village to sample oysters and champagne, strawberry teas, live jazz, classic cars, bikes and tractors and traditional summer fete activities to raise funds for the Church.

Village pub 

The Chequers Inn closed in 2016. Whilst there have been attempts to reopen it tied with some development of land behind the pub, at time of writing (June 2021) the business remains closed.

References

Villages in Bedfordshire
Former civil parishes in Bedfordshire
Borough of Bedford